Nuestra Belleza Nuevo León 2006, was held at Las Pampas Eventos in Monterrey, Nuevo León on July 13, 2006. At the conclusion of the final night of competition, Mariana Lombard of San Pedro was crowned the winner. Lombard was crowned by Nuestra Belleza Mundo México 2005 Karla Jiménez. Nine contestants competed for the state title.

The pageant was hosted by Tere Marín and Patricio Cabezut.

Results

Placements

Special awards

Judges
Héctor Sandarti - Television Host
Silvia Galván - Stylist
Elsa Burgos - Television Hostess & Miss Costa Maya International 2002
Rebeca Solano - Television Hostess

Contestants

References

External links
Official Website

Nuestra Belleza México